Prince Mirko Dimitri Petrović-Njegoš of Montenegro (17 April 1879 – 2 March 1918) was born in Cetinje, the second son of King Nicholas I of Montenegro and Milena Vukotić. Prince Mirko predeceased his father and his elder brother Crown Prince Danilo.

Marriage
On 25 July 1902, in Cetinje, Prince Mirko married Natalija Konstantinović (10 October 1882 in Trieste – 21 August 1950 in Paris), daughter of Alexander Konstantinović and wife Milena Opuić, paternal granddaughter of Aleksandar Konstantinović and wife (1842) Princess Anka Obrenović (1 April 1821 – murdered, Belgrade, 10 June 1868), daughter of Jevrem Obrenović (1790 – 20 September 1856), younger brother of Miloš Obrenović I, Prince of Serbia, and wife (1816) Tomanija Bogicević (1796 – 13 June 1881).

The couple had five sons before divorcing in October 1917: 
 Prince Šćepac (Stephan) (27 August 1903 in Cetinje – 15 March 1908 in Cannes)
 Prince Stanislaw (30 January 1905 in Cetinje – 4 January 1908 in Kotor)
 Prince Michael (14 September 1908 in Podgorica – 24 March 1986 in Paris)
 Prince Pavle (Paul) (16 May 1910 in Podgorica – June 1933)
 Prince Emmanuel (10 June 1912 in Cetinje – 26 March 1928 in Biarritz).

Their eldest surviving son Prince Michael of Montenegro, succeeded Mirko in the Montenegrin royal succession and would become head of the House of Petrović-Njegoš and pretender to the Montenegrin throne.

Serbian throne

As Prince Mirko's wife was the granddaughter of Anka (Anna) Obrenovic, a member of the Serbian House of Obrenović, it was agreed with the Serbian Government that Prince Mirko would be proclaimed Crown Prince of Serbia in the event that the marriage of King Alexander and Draga Mašin was childless.

Mirko lost his chance to succeed to the Serbian throne in 1903, due to the assassination of Alexander and Draga and the resulting conferral of the crown upon Peter Karađorđević, his brother-in-law. However, in 1911 he joined the Black Hand "Unity or Death" secret society which sought the unification of all Serbs in the Balkans, especially those under Austria-Hungary, and was determined to become the society's unified leader.

Death
Mirko divorced his wife in 1917 and moved from Paris to Vienna, where he died in 1918. Following his death, his ten-year-old son Prince Michael of Montenegro was raised in Paris by his mother and the residual members of the exiled Montenegrin Royal Family. In 1921 following the death of Mirko's father and shortly afterwards by the renouncement of the defunct throne by former Crown Prince Danilo, the thirteen-year-old Prince Michael of Montenegro became the head of the Petrović-Njegoš house, albeit initially under a pretense regency.

References

External links

 Family of King Nikola Petrovic Njegos

1879 births
1918 deaths
People from Cetinje
Princes of Montenegro
Petrović-Njegoš dynasty
Black Hand (Serbia)
Recipients of the Order of the Cross of Takovo
Burials at the Vienna Central Cemetery
Sons of kings